The Women's 200m Individual Medley at the 2006 Central American and Caribbean Games occurred on Friday, July 21, 2006, at the S.U. Pedro de Heredia Aquatic Complex in Cartagena, Colombia.

Records at the time of the event were:
World Record: 2:09.72, Wu Yanyan (China), Shanghai, China, October 17, 1997.
Games Record: 2:19.00, Carolyn Adel (Suriname), 1998 Games in Maracaibo (Aug.13.1998).

Results

Final

Preliminaries

References

Results: 2006 CACs--Swimming: Women's 200 IM--prelims from the official website of the 2006 Central American and Caribbean Games; retrieved 2009-07-11.
Results: 2006 CACs--Swimming: Women's 200 IM--finals from the official website of the 2006 Central American and Caribbean Games; retrieved 2009-07-11.

Medley, Women's 200m
2006 in women's swimming